Giulio Sabino ("Julius Sabinus") is a dramma per musica (opera seria) in three acts by Giuseppe Sarti. The libretto was by Pietro Giovannini.

The opera, staged in six or seven European countries at the end of the 18th century, was the subject of a parody in Antonio Salieri's 1786 work Prima la musica e poi le parole.

Performance history

It was first performed at the Teatro San Benedetto in Venice on 3 January 1781. The opera was revived at the Teatro Comunale Alighieri in Ravenna in 1999 (see recording section below).

Roles

Synopsis

The opera is about the triumph of conjugal love. It is set in 1st-century Gaul in the time of the Emperor Vespasian.

Recording

There is a recording made in Ravenna in 1999 by the Accademia Bizantina under Ottavio Dantone with Alessandra Palomba (Arminio), Sonia Prina (Giulio Sabino), Donatella Lombardi (Voadice), Elena Monti (Epponina), Giuseppe Filianoti (Tito), Kremena Dilcheva (Annio) (Bongiovanni CD 1173251).

References

Further reading
"Giulio Sabino" by John A Rice, in The New Grove Dictionary of Opera, ed. Stanley Sadie (London, 1992) 
 John A. Rice, "Sarti's Giulio Sabino, Haydn's Armida, and the Arrival of Opera Seria at Eszterháza"

External links
 

Operas
Italian-language operas
Opera seria
Operas by Giuseppe Sarti
1781 operas
Operas set in the 1st century